Hills is a city in Johnson County, Iowa, United States. It is part of the Iowa City, Iowa Metropolitan Statistical Area. The population was 863 at the time of the 2020 census. It is part of the Iowa City Community School District.

Geography
Hills is located at  (41.557041, -91.534992).

Demographics

2010 census
As of the census of 2010, there were 703 people, 299 households, and 190 families living in the city. The racial makeup of the city was 93.3% White, 0.3% African American, 0.7% Native American, 1.3% Asian, 1.6% from other races, and 2.8% from two or more races. Hispanic or Latino of any race were 4.0% of the population.

There were 299 households, of which 26.8% had children under the age of 18 living with them, 52.2% were married couples living together, 7.4% had a female householder with no husband present, 4.0% had a male householder with no wife present, and 36.5% were non-families. 30.8% of all households were made up of individuals, and 15.7% had someone living alone who was 65 years of age or older. The average household size was 2.22 and the average family size was 2.73.

The median age in the city was 45.2 years. 20.2% of residents were under the age of 18; 6.2% were between the ages of 18 and 24; 23.3% were from 25 to 44; 30.5% were from 45 to 64; and 19.8% were 65 years of age or older. The gender makeup of the city was 47.1% male and 52.9% female.

2000 census
As of the census of 2000, there were 679 people, 250 households, and 172 families living in the city. The racial makeup of the city was 96.91% White, 0.44% African American, 1.03% Asian, 1.18% from other races, and 0.44% from two or more races. Hispanic or Latino of any race were 1.18% of the population.

There were 250 households, out of which 32.8% had children under the age of 18 living with them, 57.6% were married couples living together, 6.8% had a female householder with no husband present, and 31.2% were non-families. 22.8% of all households were made up of individuals, and 8.4% had someone living alone who was 65 years of age or older. The average household size was 2.52 and the average family size was 2.95.

24.0% are under the age of 18, 9.3% from 18 to 24, 29.9% from 25 to 44, 20.6% from 45 to 64, and 16.2% who were 65 years of age or older. The median age was 37 years. For every 100 females, there were 102.1 males. For every 100 females age 18 and over, there were 96.2 males.

The median income for a household in the city was $51,477, and the median income for a family was $57,386. Males had a median income of $36,429 versus $29,500 for females. The per capita income for the city was $21,918. About 5.0% of families and 6.7% of the population were below the poverty line, including 9.5% of those under age 18 and 3.6% of those age 65 or over.

References

Cities in Iowa
Cities in Johnson County, Iowa
Iowa City metropolitan area